Ghardabiya Airbase is a dual-function airbase for the Libyan Air Force  south of the Mediterranean coastal city of Sirte. It also incorporates an airport for civilian use.

All runways have  displaced thresholds.

The Sirte VOR-DME (Ident: SRT) is located on the field.

Military use

It is the home base of 1124th Bomber Squadron and 1st Fighter-Bomber Squadron which operate the Su-22 aircraft. The base also operates the Aero L-39 Albatros for counterinsurgency missions.

Civilian use
Due to the First Libyan Civil War of 2011 all flights were suspended; however, since the end of the conflict, Libyan Airlines have resumed service. It is unknown if Air Libya has resumed services as well.

First Libyan Civil War (2011)
It was targeted by United States Air Force B-2 Spirit stealth bombers equipped with precision-guided munitions (PGMs) during the First Libyan Civil War on 20 and 21 March 2011. The United States Navy also participated in the attack to deny the Libyan Air Force operational capability with the use of Tomahawk cruise missiles.

Second Libyan Civil War (2014–2020)
In May 2015, during the Second Libyan Civil War, ISIL militants took control of the airport only weeks after seizing full control of nearby Sirte. On 4 June 2016, Pro-Libyan government fighters stated that they had captured the airbase from ISIL.

In January 2020, Libyan forces loyal to the eastern-based commander Khalifa Haftar said they had taken control of the strategic coastal city of Sirte, including al-Ghardabiya airbase.

See also
Transport in Libya
List of airports in Libya

References

External links
OpenStreetMap - Ghardabiya Airport

Airports in Libya
Tripolitania
Libyan Air Force bases